Upala is a district of the Upala canton, in the Alajuela province of Costa Rica.

History
Upala was granted the title of "ciudad" (city) by a law of May 4, 1970.

Geography 
Upala has an area of  km² and an elevation of  metres.

Demographics 

For the 2011 census, Upala had a population of  inhabitants.

Transportation

Road transportation 
The district is covered by the following road routes:
 National Route 4
 National Route 6
 National Route 138
 National Route 164
 National Route 728
 National Route 729
 National Route 730
 National Route 731

Economy 
Upala is a supply center for cattle ranchers and rice growers in the area. A hospital, bank, medical clinic, pharmacy and gas station are here. There is a busy commercial marketplace in the town center where vendors sell fruits, vegetables and a wide array of other home-grown products. Several small restaurants share the market area, and there are other restaurants and a few places to stay in the town.

Nearby places of interest

Caño Negro Wildlife Refuge: a watery lowland of lush sloughs and marshes, a seasonal lake, and abundant wildlife. The area is a birdwatcher's paradise. ( east of Upala via Highway 4 to Colonia Puntarenas and Highway 138 to Caño Negro)

Climate
This area  typically has a pronounced dry season.  According to the Köppen Climate Classification system, Upala has a tropical savanna climate, abbreviated "Aw" on climate maps.

References 

Districts of Alajuela Province
Populated places in Alajuela Province